Kai Locksley (born November 17, 1996) is an American professional Canadian football quarterback and wide receiver for the Edmonton Elks of the Canadian Football League (CFL).

Early life and high school
Locksley grew up in Washington, D.C. and attended the Gilman School in Baltimore, Maryland, where he played football and basketball. While he did not overlap with former Gilman standout Stephen Koteen, Locksley credits his success to mirroring Koteen’s game.  He was named second-team Private School All-State by the Associated Press after passing for 875 yards and five touchdowns and also rushing for 795 yards and 14 touchdowns during his junior season. As a senior, Locksley repeated as a second-team All-State selection after he passed for 915 yards and five touchdowns and rushed for 1,050 yards and 17 touchdowns. He was rated a four-star recruit and initially committed to play college football at Florida State entering his senior season. Locksley flipped his commitment to the University of Texas shortly before National Signing Day.

College career
Locksley began his college career at Texas and redshirted his freshman season. He was moved to wide receiver going into his redshirt freshman season. Prior to the start of the season, Locksley transferred to Arizona Western College, where he stayed for one semester and initially committed to transfer to Marshall. He later opted to transfer instead to Iowa Western Community College. In his lone season with the Reivers, he completed 176-of-265 pass attempts for 2,238 yards with 20 passing scores and six interceptions and also rushed for 705 yards and 20 touchdowns and was named the Spalding NJCAA Offensive Player of the Year. 

Locksley committed to transfer to the University of Texas at El Paso (UTEP) for his remaining collegiate eligibility. In his first season with the Miners, he made eight starts at quarterback and passed for 937 yards and three touchdowns with nine interceptions while also rushing for 340 yards and six touchdowns. As a senior, he played in 11 games and passed for 1,329 yards with six passing touchdowns and five interceptions and 535 rushing yards and scored five touchdowns.

Professional career

Miami Dolphins
Locksley was signed by the Miami Dolphins as an undrafted free agent on March 22, 2021. He played wide receiver while with Dolphins. Locksley was waived at the end of training camp during final roster cuts on August 31, 2021.

Edmonton Elks
Locksley was signed by Edmonton Elks of the Canadian Football League on January 12, 2022.

Personal life
Locksley is the son of University of Maryland head coach Mike Locksley. His older brother, Meiko, played college football at New Mexico, Iowa Western, and Lackawanna College. Meiko Locksley was murdered in 2017 in Columbia, Maryland.

Locksley was suspended from the UTEP football team on June 8, 2019, after being arrested on charges of driving while intoxicated, marijuana possession, making terroristic threats and illegal possession of a firearm. He was reinstated from his suspension on August 2, 2019.

References

External links
Texas Longhorns bio
UTEP Miners bio
Edmonton Elks bio

1996 births
Living people
Canadian football quarterbacks
American players of Canadian football
American football quarterbacks
UTEP Miners football players
Players of American football from Maryland
Edmonton Elks players
Iowa Western Reivers football players
Miami Dolphins players
Canadian football wide receivers
Texas Longhorns football players
Gilman School alumni